Nova Pazova railway station is a railway station in Nova Pazova, Stara Pazova, Serbia. Tracks extend from the station toward Stara Pazova in the northwest and Batajnica in the southeast. The station consists of 5 railway tracks.

See also 
 Serbian Railways
 Beovoz

References 

Stara Pazova
Railway stations in Vojvodina